John Douglas Fraser Drummond (April 23, 1860 – May 24, 1925) was a Canadian farmer and politician.

He was the Progressive Middlesex West Member of Parliament from 1921 until his death in 1925.

References
 
 

1860 births
1925 deaths
Members of the House of Commons of Canada from Ontario
Progressive Party of Canada MPs